Canape or Canapé may refer to:

 Canapé, a small, prepared and usually decorative food, held in the fingers
 CANape, a software tool for measuring & calibrating ECUs
 Canapé (bridge), a contract bridge bidding system
 Canapé (TV series), a cultural events show
 Canapé (furniture), an article of furniture similar to a sofa

See also
 Canope or canopic jars, used by the ancient Egyptians